Kanellos Deligiannis (1780–1862) was a Greek magnate from the Morea and the son of Ioannis Deligiannis. He was one of the main organizers of the Greek War of Independence and a politician in the independent Kingdom of Greece.

Biography
He was born in Langadia, Gortynia, and was a son of one of the most important magnates in the Peloponnese (Morea), Ioannis Deligiannis. Due to the prominence of his family in the area, he played an important role in the Greek Revolution. 

He fought at Missolonghi, Peta, Tripolitsa, and elsewhere. During the Greek civil wars of 1824–1825, he joined with many chiefs of the Peloponnese and Hydra and convinced Theodoros Kolokotronis to join them by offering his daughter in marriage to one of Kolokotronis' sons. In the second round of the civil war, he was imprisoned along with Kolokotronis by the provisional government of Georgios Kountouriotis. After Independence, he became a speaker of the Greek Parliament in 1844–1845.

Deligiannis also wrote memoirs, which are considered controversial, as they seek to justify his father's pro-Turkish stance as being beneficial for the Greek population. His memoirs also portray the rivalries of the various groups and the leading families of the Peloponnese before and during the Revolution.

He died in 1862.

1780 births
1862 deaths
Ottoman-era Greek primates
Greek military leaders of the Greek War of Independence
Speakers of the Hellenic Parliament
People from Langadia, Arcadia